Run, Man, Run (also known as Big Gundown 2) is an Italian-French Zapata Western film. It is the second film of Sergio Sollima centred on the character of Cuchillo, again played by Tomas Milian, after the two-years earlier successful western The Big Gundown. It is also the final chapter of the political-western trilogy of Sollima, and his last spaghetti western. According to the same Sollima, Run, Man, Run is the most politic, the most revolutionary and even anarchic among his movies.

Plot
When Cuchillo returns to his hometown in Mexico he soon finds himself in prison, sharing a cell with a dangerous desperado, the poet Ramirez. Despite a pardon and release in one day, Ramirez hires Cuchillo to help him escape. Waiting for his release are numerous bounty hunters eager for the price on Ramirez's head. Evading the hunters, they make it to Ramirez's village, but only minutes before the revolutionary bandit Reza arrives.  Ramirez is shot but before he dies, he passes information to Cuchillo regarding $3M in hidden gold, and charges him with returning it to the revolutionary leader, Santillana. Hot on Cuchillo's trail are French mercenaries serving President Diaz, Reza and his bandits, an American gunslinger, and Cuchillo's fiancé, Dolores...who simply wants Cuchillo to stop running and marry her. Deceptions and double-crosses rule as all parties race to discover the gold cache.

Cast 
 Tomas Milian: Manuel "Cuchillo" Sanchez 
 Donal O'Brien: Nathaniel Cassidy
 Linda Veras: Penny Bannington
 John Ireland: Santillana
 Chelo Alonso: Dolores
 Marco Guglielmi: Colonel Michel Sévigny
 José Torres: Ramirez
 Edward Ross: Jean-Paul
 Nello Pazzafini: Riza
 Gianni Rizzo: Mayor Christopher Bannington
 Dan May: Mateos Gonzalez
 Noé Murayama: Pablo
 Attilio Dottesio: Manuel Etchevaria
 Orso Maria Guerrini: Raul
 Federico Boido: Steve Wilkins
 Calisto Calisti: Fernando Lopez

Soundtrack
In addition to composing a large amount of film scores himself, Bruno Nicolai also conducted many of Ennio Morricone's film scores. In an interview in the featurette Run Man Run: 35 Years Running, director Sergio Sollima stated that Morricone, who was then contracted with Universal Pictures was not allowed to work for any other film company, but composed the score to the film without credit.

References

External links

1968 films
Spaghetti Western films
Films directed by Sergio Sollima
Films scored by Ennio Morricone
Mexican Revolution films
1968 Western (genre) films
Films shot in Almería
1960s Italian-language films
1960s Italian films